Emergency 3: Mission:Life is the third game in the rescue simulation Emergency series, developed by Sixteen Tons Entertainment and released between 2005 and 2006. It is the direct continuation of Emergency 2: The Ultimate Fight for Life. The game's sequel, Emergency 4: Global Fighters for Life, known in North America as 911: First Responders, was released in Europe on April 16, 2006, only a few days after the North American release of Emergency 3.

Gameplay

The first 3D entry in the franchise, Emergency 3 played similar to its predecessors, in which the player is tasked with directing emergency services in 20 fictional incidents from traffic accidents to terrorist attacks, as well as everyday emergencies in endless modes. The rescue forces were joined by new Technical Assistants tasked with handling miscellaneous issues.

The game also includes an editor to create custom scenarios, units and scripts.

Reception
Reception for Emergency 3: Mission:Life was mixed, issues stated were "Clumsy, frustrating interface" and "Spotty artificial intelligence".

 PC Games June 5 – 76% 
 GameSpot June 2–5.3 
PC Games (Germany) – Jan 26, 2005
GameStar (Germany) – Jan, 2005
GameSpot – Jun 02, 2006

See also
 Emergency (video game series)

References

External links
 
 

2005 video games
Medical video games
Single-player video games
Sixteen Tons Entertainment games
Strategy First games
Tactical role-playing video games
Take-Two Interactive games
Video games about firefighting
Video games about police officers
Video games developed in Germany
Windows games
Windows-only games